On Golden Smog was the debut EP from American band Golden Smog, released in 1992.

Background
Golden Smog was a loosely connected group of musicians comprising, at various times, members of Soul Asylum, The Replacements, Wilco, The Jayhawks, Run Westy Run, The Honeydogs and Big Star. Golden Smog's lineup has often changed, but relative constants who appear on all the recordings are guitarists Kraig Johnson (Run Westy Run), Dan Murphy (Soul Asylum) and Gary Louris (The Jayhawks), along with bassist Marc Perlman (The Jayhawks).

The album consists entirely of cover songs. The album sleeve art was by the band's then-drummer, Chris Mars. The track "Shooting Star" was featured in the 1994 film Clerks.

On Golden Smog was reissued in 1996 by Rykodisc.

Reception

Writing for Allmusic, music critic Jason Ankeny wrote of the album "After a few years of haphazard shows in and about their native Minneapolis, the members of Golden Smog were approached by a small local label to put out a record; many, many beers later, On Golden Smog appeared."

Track listing
 "Son (We've Kept the Room Just the Way You Left It)"  – 4:26 - A Michaelangelo cover.
 "Easy to Be Hard"  – 3:20 - A Hair Cover. (Sung by The Jayhawks' Gary Louris)
 "Shooting Star"  – 4:44 - A Bad Company Cover. (Sung by Soul Asylum's Dave Pirner).
 "Back Street Girl"  – 3:55 - A Rolling Stones Cover.
 "Cowboy Song"  – 5:29 - A Thin Lizzy Cover. (Sung by Soul Asylum roadie, Bill Sullivan).

Personnel
The band members of Golden Smog used pseudonyms in the credits.

Anthony James (Dave Pirner) – vocals
Johnny Vincent – voices
David Spear-Way (Dan Murphy) – vocals, voices in your head, guitar, ocarina
Jarret Decatur-Laine (Kraig Johnson) – vocals, guitar, choreography, light show
Raymond Virginia-Circle (Marc Perlman) – bass, staplegun, fish, synthesizer
Eddie Garfield-Avenue (Chris Mars) – drums, kazoo
Michael Macklyn-Drive (Gary Louris) – vocals, bass pedals, kettle drums, string arrangements
The Straight Shooter Chorus – background vocals

Production notes
Paul Pacific – producer
Sir James Bunchberry – engineer
Chris Mars – artwork
Dave Pinsky – editing
Bonnie Lynn Butler – photography
Dave Biljan – design

References 

Golden Smog albums
1992 EPs
Covers EPs
Rykodisc EPs